Waitomo is a rural community in the King Country region of New Zealand's North Island. There are several solutional cave systems in the area around the village, which are popular tourist attractions. Restaurants and accommodation are centred in the village to serve visiting tourists.

The word Waitomo comes from the Māori language: wai meaning water and tomo meaning a doline or sinkhole; it can thus be translated to be "water passing through a hole". The caves are formed in Oligocene limestone.

The historic Waitomo Caves Hotel is located in Waitomo Caves village.

History 
The village Waitomo Caves is named for the hundreds of caves present in the spectacular karst landscape.

The limestone landscape of the Waitomo District area has been the centre of increasingly popular commercial caving tourism since before 1900. Initially mostly consisting of impromptu trips guided by local Māori, a large cave system near Waitomo Caves were nationalised by the Crown and managed as a (relatively genteel) tourism attraction from 1904 onwards. A 1915 guide said, "It is reached by railway to Hangatiki, thence 6 miles by coach along a good road".

A visit to Waitomo Caves made number 14 amongst a list of 101 "Kiwi must-do's" in a New Zealand Automobile Association poll of over 20,000 motorists published 2007, and in 2004, around 400,000 visitors entered caves in the area.

The Waitomo Caves Museum provides information about the karst landscape, caves and caving and the history of the area.

Tourist caves 

Companies specialise in leading tourists through the caves of the area, from easily accessible areas with hundreds of tourists per hour in the peak season, to extreme sports, like crawls into cave systems, which are only seen by a few tourists each day.

The caves are noted for their stalactite and stalagmite displays, and (in the caves with streams running through) for the presence of glowworms (the fungus gnat Arachnocampa luminosa).

Walks 

At the reserve the Ruakuri Walk leads through short caves to the Ruakuri Natural Bridge.

Te Araroa, a national long distance walkway, passes through Waitomo. The section from Mt Pirongia joins the Waitomo Walkway to enter the village. The  section to Te Kuiti goes over Mangapu River suspension bridge and through Pehitawa kahikatea forest.

Demographics

Hangatiki had a population of 1,185 at the 2018 New Zealand census, an increase of 84 people (7.6%) since the 2013 census, and an increase of 126 people (11.9%) since the 2006 census. There were 432 households, comprising 618 males and 564 females, giving a sex ratio of 1.1 males per female. The median age was 41.4 years (compared with 37.4 years nationally), with 240 people (20.3%) aged under 15 years, 213 (18.0%) aged 15 to 29, 543 (45.8%) aged 30 to 64, and 189 (15.9%) aged 65 or older.

Ethnicities were 72.9% European/Pākehā, 36.5% Māori, 1.3% Pacific peoples, 1.5% Asian, and 1.8% other ethnicities. People may identify with more than one ethnicity.

The percentage of people born overseas was 11.4, compared with 27.1% nationally.

Although some people chose not to answer the census's question about religious affiliation, 57.0% had no religion, 31.4% were Christian, 3.3% had Māori religious beliefs, 0.5% were Hindu and 1.5% had other religions.

Of those at least 15 years old, 138 (14.6%) people had a bachelor's or higher degree, and 219 (23.2%) people had no formal qualifications. The median income was $34,000, compared with $31,800 nationally. 123 people (13.0%) earned over $70,000 compared to 17.2% nationally. The employment status of those at least 15 was that 558 (59.0%) people were employed full-time, 165 (17.5%) were part-time, and 21 (2.2%) were unemployed.

Marae

The community has a number of marae, affiliated with Ngāti Maniapoto hapū:

 Kaputuhi Marae is affiliated with the hapū of Ngāti Matakore, Pare te Kawa, Ngāti Peehi and Rōrā.
 Te Kauae Marae and Te Kauae o Niu Tereni meeting house are affiliated with the hapū of Huiao, Ngāti Kinohaku, Ngāti Peehi and Ngāti Te Kanawa.
 Te Korapatu Marae is affiliated with the hapū of Peehi and Te Kanawa.
 Pohatuiri Marae is affiliated with the hapū of Uekaha.
 Tokikapu Marae and Matua  Iwi meeting house are affiliated with the hapū of Ruapuha, Te Kanawa and Uekaha.

Education

References

External links

 Waitomo Caves area in Episode 4 "Caves" of BBC's Planet Earth.
 Waitomo Caves Museum & Discovery Centre

Waitomo District
Populated places in Waikato